Count Franz von Walsegg (January 17, 1763 – November 11, 1827) was an aristocrat, living in Stuppach Castle near Gloggnitz, who is best remembered for having commissioned a requiem mass from Wolfgang Amadeus Mozart in 1791 following the death of his twenty-year-old wife Anna (the grieving count, only 28 himself at the time, would never remarry). A Freemason and amateur musician, Walsegg had a penchant for commissioning works from composers of the day and then passing them off as his own in private performances.  In his account of the commission of the requiem mass from Mozart, Anton Herzog states:

Although Mozart died before completing the Requiem, Constanze Mozart arranged for several other composers, most notably Franz Xaver Süssmayr, to complete the work in order to gain the remainder of the sum Walsegg had promised.

Notes

References
 Bernard Jacobson (1995), "Catholic with Masonic Overtones" (insert in Sacred Music, CD#18 of the Best of the Complete Mozart Edition), Philips: Germany.

1763 births
1827 deaths
Wolfgang Amadeus Mozart's employers and patrons